Paget Glacier is a glacier in South Georgia, 4 miles (6 km) long and 1 mile (1.6 km) wide, which flows northeast from the north slopes of Mount Paget into the west side of Nordenskjold Glacier. The glacier was roughly surveyed in 1928–29 by a German expedition under Kohl-Larsen, and resurveyed in 1951–52 by the SGS. The name, which is derived from nearby Mount Paget, was given by the SGS in 1951–52.

See also
 List of glaciers in the Antarctic
 Glaciology

References

Glaciers of South Georgia